Norfolk Community Health and Care NHS Trust is a provider of community services to a population of about 882,000 in Norfolk.  It was  established under the Transforming Community Services initiative. It comprises the community services previously run by Norfolk Primary Care Trust.

It employs 2,250 full-time equivalent members of staff.  Roisin Fallon-Williams was appointed chief executive in March 2015. in succession to Michael Scott. Lisa Christensen, former head of Norfolk County Council's children's services department resigned after two weeks as a non-executive member of the board in November 2014.

It is part of a joint venture with West Suffolk NHS Foundation Trust and Ipswich Hospital NHS Trust which took over the provision of community care in Suffolk from Serco in October 2015.

Performance
The trust was rated outstanding by the Care Quality Commission in 2018.  "There were many notable examples of outstanding practice… We saw examples where patients had become members of steering groups and attended staff mandatory training days to provide patient perspectives to staff."

In 2022 it set up a remote monitoring service using Inhealthcare software to help increase life expectancy and  quality of life for patients diagnosed with heart failure.  Patients will monitor their own vital signs at home and relay the readings to clinicians, who will intervene if they provide any cause for concern.  This should produce significant reductions in hospital bed days, A&E attendances, GP visits, travel to hospitals and out-of-hours appointments.

References

External links 
 Official website
 CQC inspection reports

Health in Norfolk
Community health NHS trusts